David Rowland may refer to:

David Rowland (industrial designer) (1924–2010), American industrial designer
David Rowland (property developer) (born 1945), British property developer
David Rowland (translator) (1569–1586), Welsh translator